Carlos Benítez Pérez (born November 1, 1987) is a Cuban professional baseball second baseman for Alazanes de Granma in the Cuban National Series.

Benítez played for the Cuba national baseball team at the 2017 World Baseball Classic and 2019 Pan American Games.

References

External links

1987 births
Living people
Cuban baseball players
Baseball second basemen
Alazanes de Granma players
2017 World Baseball Classic players
Baseball players at the 2019 Pan American Games
Pan American Games competitors for Cuba
People from Yara, Cuba